The genus Aesculus ( or ), with species called buckeye and horse chestnut, comprises 13–19 species of flowering plants in the family Sapindaceae. They are trees and shrubs native to the temperate Northern Hemisphere, with six species native to North America and seven to 13 species native to Eurasia. Several hybrids occur. Aesculus exhibits a classical Arcto-Tertiary distribution. 

Mexican buckeye seedpods resemble the Aesculus seedpods, but belong to a different genus.

Carl Linnaeus named the genus Aesculus after the Roman name for an edible acorn. Common names for these trees include "buckeye" and "horse chestnut", though they are not in the same order as the true chestnuts, Castanea in the Fagales. Some are also called white chestnut or red chestnut. In Britain, they are sometimes called conker trees because of their link with the game of conkers, played with the seeds, also called conkers.

Description
Species are deciduous or evergreen. Flowers are showy, insect- or bird-pollinated, with four or five petals fused into a lobed corolla tube, arranged in a panicle inflorescence. Flowering starts after 80–110 growing degree days. The fruit matures to a capsule  diameter, usually globose, containing one to three seeds (often erroneously called a nut) per capsule. Capsules containing more than one seed result in flatness on one side of the seeds. The point of attachment of the seed in the capsule (hilum) shows as a large, circular, whitish scar. The capsule epidermis has "spines" (botanically: prickles) in some species, while other capsules are warty or smooth. At maturity, the capsule splits into three sections to release the seeds.

Aesculus seeds were traditionally eaten, after leaching, by the Jōmon people of Japan over about four millennia, until 300 AD.

All parts of the buckeye or horse chestnut tree are moderately toxic, including the nut-like seeds. The toxin affects the gastrointestinal system, causing gastrointestinal disturbances. The USDA notes that the toxicity is due to saponin aescin and glucoside aesculin, with alkaloids possibly contributing.

Native Americans used to crush the seeds and the resulting mash was thrown into still or sluggish waterbodies to stun or kill fish. They then boiled and drained (leached) the fish at least three times to dilute the toxin's effects. New shoots from the seeds also have been known to kill grazing cattle.

The genus was considered to be in the ditypic family Hippocastanaceae along with Billia, but phylogenetic analyses of morphological and molecular data have more recently caused this family, along with the Aceraceae (maples and Dipteronia), to be included in the soapberry family (Sapindaceae).

Selected species
The species of Aesculus include:

Cultivation
The most familiar member of the genus worldwide is the common horse chestnut, Aesculus hippocastanum. The yellow buckeye, Aesculus flava (syn. A. octandra), is also a valuable ornamental tree with yellow flowers, but is less widely planted. Among the smaller species is the bottlebrush buckeye, Aesculus parviflora, a flowering shrub. Several other members of the genus are used as ornamentals, and several horticultural hybrids have also been developed, most notably the red horse chestnut Aesculus × carnea, a hybrid between A. hippocastanum and A. pavia.

In art

Interpretations of the tree leaves can be seen in architectural details in the Reims Cathedral.

In history
The horse chestnut was not native to Britain and was only introduced from Europe in 1650 (on the eastates of both Dawyck House and Stobo Castle).

The leaf of Aesculus was the official symbol of Kyiv on its coat of arms used from 1969 to 1995. It remains an official symbol of Kyiv to this day.

In the 1840 U.S. presidential campaign, candidate William Henry Harrison called himself the "log cabin and hard cider candidate", portraying himself sitting in a log cabin made of buckeye logs and drinking hard cider, causing Ohio to become known as "the Buckeye State".

In Geneva, Switzerland, an official chestnut tree is used to indicate the beginning of the Spring; every year since 1818, the tree is observed by the secretary of the Grand Council of Geneva (the local parliament), and the opening of the first leaf is recorded and announced publicly. Over the years, four different horse chestnut trees have been used for these recordings.

See also 
 Anne Frank tree

References

Explanatory notes

Citations

External links

 Germplasm Resources Information Network: Aesculus
 Forest, F., Drouin, J. N., Charest, R., Brouillet, L., & Bruneau A. (2001). "A morphological phylogenetic analysis of Aesculus L. and Billia Peyr. (Sapindaceae)". Can. J. Bot. 79 (2): 154–169. .
 Aesculus glabra (Ohio buckeye) King's American Dispensatory
 Winter ID pictures

 
Sapindaceae genera
Taxa named by Carl Linnaeus